The 2017 European Modern Pentathlon Championships is held in Minsk, Belarus from 17–24 July 2017.

Medal summary

Men's events

Women's events

Mixed events

Medal table

References

Results
http://www.uipmworld.org/event/european-senior-championships-1

European Modern Pentathlon Championships
European Modern Pentathlon Championships
European Modern Pentathlon Championships
International sports competitions hosted by Belarus
July 2017 sports events in Europe